The  Araranguá River is a river of Santa Catarina state in southeastern Brazil.

History
One of the earliest documented attestation of the river, still bearing the name of Ararunga, was cited by João Teixeira Albernaz. The origin of this name remains unknown to this date.

See also
List of rivers of Santa Catarina

References
 Map from Ministry of Transport

Rivers of Santa Catarina (state)